Pedro Maratea (December 21, 1912 – July 1, 2002) was an Argentine film actor.

Selected filmography
 Outside the Law (1937)
 Paths of Faith (1938)
 Mother Gloria (1940)
 Santos Vega Returns (1947)
 Night Arrival (1949)
Suburb (1951)

References

Bibliography 
 Finkielman, Jorge. The Film Industry in Argentina: An Illustrated Cultural History. McFarland, 2003.

External links 
 

1912 births
2002 deaths
Argentine male film actors
Argentine male stage actors
20th-century Argentine male actors
People from Buenos Aires